Baldy pipe, or the Mount Baldy Pipeline, is the name given by skateboarders to an iconic skate spot in Los Angeles County. It is a water pipeline that brings water from the San Antonio Dam to the county of Los Angeles. In the early history of street skateboarding, it became a popular spot for skateboarders and was featured in many skate videos. It has been used as a skate spot since the 1970s.

References

Skateboarding spots